Erich Fischer (31 December 1909 – December 1990) was a German international footballer.

References

1909 births
1990 deaths
Association football forwards
German footballers
Germany international footballers